Victor Rietti (29 February 1888 – 3 December 1963) was an Italian-born actor and director who became known through his work in television, especially through the many live television productions of the Italian play To Live in Peace during the 1950s. He was knighted by the Italian government.

Career
Born in Ferrara, Italy in 1888 to a wealthy family, Vittorio Rietti was the eleventh of the twelve children of Samuele and Lucia Rietti. At the age of 13 he was discovered by the tragedian actor Tommaso Salvini while partaking in a charity performance. Salvini encouraged the boy to make the stage his career and it was under Salvini that he studied acting.

Rietti made his stage debut playing in Shakespeare at Bologna. At age 19 he had the distinction of being juvenile lead to Eleonora Duse in her company. But his parents, who wanted him to develop his musical talents, had him resume his studies and Vittorio studied violin at the Royal Conservatory of Brussels. Studying together with him in Brussels was his cousin Vittorio Rieti (later a Broadway composer). He formed his own band the Rietti String Players with considerable success. He served in the Italian Army during the First World War.

After World War I, Rietti resumed his stage career. In 1921 he founded Drama Players Theater (Later called Teatro Italiano and still later International Theater) which he ran for 40 years, producing popular Italian plays of the time. He would personally translate and adapt these plays into English and play the lead. He often cast his young son Bobby Rietti (known as Robert Rietti as an adult) in these plays. As a sideline, he taught acting, among his pupils were Ida Lupino, June Duprez and his son Bobby. His other son, Ronald Rietti, later became a film director and producer.

Vittorio's first motion picture was released in 1933, for which he was credited as Victor Rietti. He would appear in around 36 motion pictures, including a role as Beppo in Sinfonia Fatale (1946), the first American motion picture to be shot entirely in Italy. He made a cameo appearance in Come Fly with Me (1963) which would be his last film. He also broadcast in some 43 radio plays.

Stardom
Rietti had a major success in the live television production of To Live in Peace (1951), playing the lead role, the lovable priest Don Geronimo Bonaparte, uncle of Napoleon - a part he previously played on the stage in one of his own productions. He had personally translated the Italian play by Giovacchino Forzano and adapted it for television. The television play won critical acclaim being voted best play of 1951. Rietti himself was given the critics' Oscar for best television actor of 1951 for his performance.

Due to popular demand, To Live in Peace was re-staged for television in early 1952 (BBC), 1956 (RAI), and again in 1957 (BBC), and was broadcast for radio as well in 1953 and 1956 with Rietti repeating his performance in all six productions, and his son Robert playing the part of Maso. In addition NBC's prestigious Kraft Theatre televised a special color broadcast of To Live in Peace in 1953 - the first of only two color broadcasts Kraft Theatre did in its eleven-year run. CBC Television televised it in 1957. Rietti's television success with To Live in Peace led to his touring internationally with the play for Ralph Reader. Samuel French bought the book rights to the play, and published it in 1952. Producer Sydney Box planned a motion picture of the play starring Rietti which never evolved. Eleven additional radio productions of the play were broadcast around the world. Rietti's overnight success led to his surprise appearance on the televised gala special Life Begins at Sixty and established him as a lead actor in television.

His success in television continued, his most memorable performances being the title role in The Wanderer (1952) and Professor Toti in Against The Stream (1959), both lead roles of Italian plays he had translated and adapted for television. For American television he guest starred with his son Robert Rietty in The Jack Benny Program (1957) in which he played two roles, and Harry's Girls (1963), both directed by his friend Ralph Levy. He guest starred on The Bob Hope Show in 1954.

Later life
On 23 July 1959, Victor Rietti and his son Robert were knighted with the title of Cavaliere by the Italian Government for their contribution to Italian culture, in particular for translating and adapting a great many Italian plays into English. When Rietti was only 35 years old he was given six months to live by his doctors due to a heart condition. On 3 December 1963, some 40 years later, he suffered a fatal heart attack. His life story was dramatized in the BBC radio play Papa Rietti.

Partial filmography

Bitter Sweet (1933)
Heads We Go (1933) - Hotel Manager (uncredited)
The Song You Gave Me (1933) - Nightclub Manager (uncredited)
Jew Süss (1934) - Rabbi (uncredited)
Oh, Daddy! (1935) - Hotel Manager
Escape Me Never (1935) - Italian Grocer (uncredited)
Jimmy Boy (1935)
Man of the Moment (1935) - Hotel Manager (uncredited)
The Ghost Goes West (1935) - Scientist (uncredited)
Two Hearts in Harmony (1935) - Calvazzi
Jack of All Trades (1936) - Head Waiter (uncredited)
Where There's a Will (1936) - Maitre D (uncredited)
Juggernaut (1936) - Doctor Bousquet
Dusty Ermine (1936) - Luggage Snatcher (uncredited)
Show Flat (1936)
Shipmates o' Mine (1936) - Photographer (uncredited)
London Melody (1937) - Joseph Domingo (uncredited)
Who's Your Lady Friend? (1937)
Take It from Me (1937) - Sailor (uncredited)
The Divorce of Lady X (1938) - Monsieur Bianco - Hotel Manager (uncredited)
The Viper (1938)
21 Days (1940) - Antonio (uncredited)
Room for Two (1940) - Gaston
Thunder Rock (1942) - Doctor (uncredited)
The Peterville Diamond (1943) - Board Member (uncredited)
Yellow Canary (1943) - George - Night Club Manager (uncredited)
Hotel Reserve (1944) - Restaurant Owner (uncredited)
Give Us the Moon (1944) - Maître d (uncredited)
Fatal Symphony (1947) - Beppo
A Man About the House (1947) - Porter at train station (uncredited)
The Glass Mountain (1949) - (uncredited)
Mr. H.C. Andersen (1950) - King Frederick
Little World of Don Camillo (1952) - Bishop (voice)
The Story of Esther Costello (1957) - Signor Gatti
The Naked Truth (1957) - Doctor
The Story of Joseph and His Brethren (1960) - Baker
Village of Daughters (1962) - Luigi
Come Fly with Me (1963) - Old Passenger (uncredited)

Sources
 To Live in Peace – A Play in Three Acts by Victor Rietti (London: Samuel French Limited, 1952)
 A Forehead Pressed against a Window by Robert Rietti (New York, 2009)

References

External links 
 Victor Rietti at the Internet Movie Database (IMDB)

1888 births
1963 deaths
20th-century Italian Jews
Italian male television actors
Italian theatre directors
20th-century Italian male actors
Italian–English translators
Italian emigrants to the United Kingdom
Italian military personnel of World War I
Italian dramatists and playwrights
20th-century Italian screenwriters
Italian male screenwriters
20th-century translators
Actors from Ferrara
20th-century Italian male writers